The Khorat snail-eating turtle (Malayemys khoratensis) is a species of turtle in the family Geoemydidae. They are freshwater turtles from Khorat Plateau in Thailand (hence where they get their name from) but were found for the first time in Udon Thani, Thailand.

References

Geoemydidae
Reptiles described in 2016
Reptiles of Cambodia
Reptiles of Laos
Reptiles of Thailand
Reptiles of Vietnam